The 2000 Eastbourne Borough Council election took place on 4 May 2000 to elect members of Eastbourne Borough Council in East Sussex, England. One third of the council was up for election and the Conservative Party gained overall control of the council from no overall control.

After the election, the composition of the council was:
Conservative 18
Liberal Democrats 12

Election result
Overall turnout at the election was 30.90%, down from 32.36% at the 1999 election.

Ward results

By-elections between 2000 and 2002

References

2000
2000 English local elections
2000s in East Sussex